Anna Kaplan (née Monahemi) (born August 23, 1965) is an American politician from Great Neck, New York. A Democrat, she was a member of the New York State Senate, representing New York's 7th State Senate district, which runs from the North Shore to roughly the central part of Western Nassau County on Long Island. She is a member of the so-called "Long Island Six," a group of six Democrats who represent Long Island in the New York State Senate and often vote as a block. She was elected in 2018 as part of a wave of Democrats who defeated Republican incumbents and brought control of the New York Senate to the Democrats for only the third time since World War II.

Kaplan is the first Iranian-American to be elected to either of New York state's legislative chambers and she is the first former political refugee to serve in the New York Senate.

Early life and education
Kaplan was born to an Iranian Jewish family in Tabriz, Iran and raised in Tehran, where her father was a carpet dealer. When the Islamic Revolution swept the country, Anna's parents sent her to the United States for safety at age 13. Arriving as an unaccompanied child refugee in Crown Heights, Brooklyn, Anna was sent to live with a foster family in Chicago, Illinois, until her parents were able to legally enter the United States. After her family reunited in Chicago, they moved to Queens, New York, and then to Great Neck, New York.

Kaplan attended the Stern College at Yeshiva University, and received her J.D. from Cardozo School of Law in New York City.

Early political career
Kaplan started her political career as a member of the North Hempstead Town Board in 2011, and served until her election to the state senate. She had previously served as a trustee of the Great Neck Public Library and was also a member of the North Hempstead Board of Zoning Appeals.

2016 New York Congressional Primary
On January 11, 2016, Kaplan announced that she would run for the seat in the United States House of Representatives for  being vacated by retiring congressman Steve Israel. Kaplan was defeated in the 2016 New York Congressional Democratic Primary by former Nassau County Executive Tom Suozzi. Suozzi went on to win the general election.

2018 New York Senate Election
On April 27, 2018, flanked by Nassau County Democratic Party Chairman Jay Jacobs and New York Governor Andrew Cuomo, Kaplan announced her candidacy for the New York State Senate's 7th District to a large gathering of supporters and state and local Democratic elected officials at the "Yes We Can Community Center" in Westbury, New York. On August 1, 2018, Kaplan became the first candidate for New York State office to be endorsed by former President Barack Obama.

On November 6, 2018, Kaplan defeated incumbent Senator Elaine Phillips and won election to the New York State Senate with 55% of the vote.

State Senate
Kaplan is Chairperson of the Senate Committee on Commerce, Economic Development and Small Business, and is a member of the Senate Committees on Children and Families, Internet and Technology, Judiciary, Mental Health and Developmental Disabilities, Transportation and Women's Issues. She is also a member of the Legislative Women's Caucus.

In January 2019, Kaplan was one of four new state senators spotlighted by the New York Times in a piece on first-time New York senators.

Personal life
Kaplan and her husband, Darren, live in Great Neck, New York, and have two college-age daughters.

References

Democratic Party New York (state) state senators
Politicians from Nassau County, New York
Iranian refugees
Exiles of the Iranian Revolution in the United States
People from Tabriz
People with acquired American citizenship
Yeshiva University alumni
Living people
Iranian Jews
American politicians of Iranian descent
American people of Iranian-Jewish descent
Jewish American state legislators in New York (state)
21st-century American women politicians
21st-century American politicians
1965 births
21st-century American Jews